"Life's Highway" is a song written by Richard Leigh and Roger Murrah, and recorded by American country music artist Steve Wariner.  It was released in March 1986 as the second single and title track from the album Life's Highway and was his fourth number-one hit on the Billboard Hot Country Singles & Tracks chart. It was also number 2 hit in Canada.

Chart performance

References

1986 singles
1985 songs
Steve Wariner songs
Songs written by Richard Leigh (songwriter)
Songs written by Roger Murrah
Song recordings produced by Jimmy Bowen
Song recordings produced by Tony Brown (record producer)
MCA Records singles